Orr Iron Company, also known as Shelby Steel-Orr Iron, was a historic building in downtown Evansville, Indiana.  It was built in 1912. It was demolished in 2008.

It was listed on the National Register of Historic Places in 1982.

References

Industrial buildings and structures on the National Register of Historic Places in Indiana
Industrial buildings completed in 1912
National Register of Historic Places in Evansville, Indiana
Buildings and structures in Evansville, Indiana